The list of NCAA major college football yearly scoring leaders identifies the NCAA major college scoring leaders.  Beginning with the 1937 college football season, when the NCAA began maintaining official records, the list includes each year's leaders both in total points scored and in points scored per game.  The list is limited to players for major college programs, which includes the NCAA Division I Football Bowl Subdivision (2006–present), NCAA Division I-A (1978–2005), and NCAA University Division (1956–1977).

Scoring leaders since 1937

Pre-1937 unofficial data 
Before 1937 the NCAA did not compile official statistics. This chart reflects unofficial scoring statistics for years prior to 1937.

References

Scoring